Hydromorphinol (RAM-320, 14-Hydroxydihydromorphine), also  is an opiate analogue that is a derivative of morphine, where the 14-position has been hydroxylated and the 7,8- double bond saturated. It has similar effects to morphine such as sedation, analgesia and respiratory depression, but is twice as potent as morphine and has a steeper dose-response curve and longer half-life.  It is used in medicine as the bitartrate salt (free base conversion ratio 0.643, molecular weight 471.5) and hydrochloride (free base conversion ratio 0.770, molecular weight 393.9)

It is also called α-Oxymorphol, and oxymorphol is itself a mixture of hydromorphinol and 4,5α-Epoxy-17-methylmorphinan-3,6β,14-triol, β-Oxymorphol, which is different at position 6 on the morphine carbon skeleton.

Hydromorphinol was developed in Austria in 1932. In the United States, it was never available and is classified as a Schedule I drug with a DEA ACSCN of 9301.  The salts in use are the bitartrate (free base conversion ratio 0.643) and hydrochloride (0.770).  The 2014 national aggregate manufacturing quota was 2 grams, unchanged from prior years.

Hydromorphinol is metabolised mainly in the liver in the same fashion as many other opioids and is itself a minor active metabolite of 14-Hydroxydihydrocodeine, an uncommonly used opiate (but is therefore also an active metabolite of a first-order active metabolite of oxycodone).

It is distributed under the trade name Numorphan in some countries.  It is controlled under the Single Convention On Narcotic Drugs.

See also 
 Oxymorphol
 N-Phenethylhydromorphinol (RAM-378)

References 

Cyclohexanols
4,5-Epoxymorphinans
Mu-opioid receptor agonists
Opioids
Phenols
Semisynthetic opioids